Garden Acres was an unincorporated community in Tarrant County, located in the U.S. state of Texas. The area is now largely within the city of Fort Worth, located between Rendon and Everman to the south of the city.

References

Unincorporated communities in Tarrant County, Texas
Unincorporated communities in Texas